Chemins de fer Québec-Gatineau Inc. (CFQG), in English the Quebec Gatineau Railway  is a shortline railway operating the  long ex-Canadian Pacific Railway line between Quebec City, Trois-Rivières, Laval, Lachute and Gatineau, formerly Hull. It was acquired in 1997 by Genesee & Wyoming Canada Inc., subsidiary of Genesee & Wyoming Inc.

Trois-Rivières Subdivision

Saint-Gabriel Spur

Saint-Maurice Valley Subdivision

Lachute Subdivision

Buckingham Spur

Montfort Subdivision

See also 

 Lemieux Island
 Chief William Commanda Bridge

References

External links
Quebec Gatineau Railway official webpage - Genesee and Wyoming website
Canadian Trackside Guide

Quebec railways
Transport in Capitale-Nationale
Genesee & Wyoming
Companies based in Montreal
Railway companies established in 1997